The 1920 Saxony state election was held on 14 November 1920 to elect the 96 members of the Landtag of Saxony.

Results

References 

Saxony
Elections in Saxony